Jacob C. Colhouer (January 15, 1922 – April 14, 1998) was an American football guard who played four seasons in the National Football League with the Chicago Cardinals and New York Giants. He was drafted by the Chicago Cardinals in the ninth round of the 1946 NFL Draft. He played college football at Oklahoma State University and attended Warren High School in Warren, Oklahoma.

College career
Colhouer played for the Oklahoma State Cowboys. He graduated with an engineering degree.

Professional career

Chicago Cardinals
Colhouer was selected by the Chicago Cardinals with the 71st pick in the 1946 NFL Draft. He played in 32 games, starting three, for the Cardinals from 1946 to 1948.

New York Giants
Colhouer played in eight games, starting two, for the New York Giants during the 1949 season.

Personal life
Colhouer moved to Lake Oswego, Oregon in 1956 and owned and operated Colhouer Demolition Co. He was also co-founder of Community Bank in Lake Oswego and Lake Oswego Montessori School. He retired in 1983 and donated his business to the Oregon Association of Children and Adults with Learning Disabilities.

References

External links
Just Sports Stats

1922 births
1998 deaths
Players of American football from Oklahoma
American football guards
Oklahoma State Cowboys football players
Chicago Cardinals players
New York Giants players
20th-century American businesspeople
Businesspeople from Oklahoma
People from Altus, Oklahoma
Sportspeople from Lake Oswego, Oregon